Astartea glomerulosa, commonly known as early astartea, is a shrub endemic to Western Australia.

Description and Distribution
It blooms between October and April producing white-pink flowers.

It is found along the south coast on slopes, river banks and disturbed sites in the South West and Great Southern regions of Western Australia where it grows in sandy-loamy-clay soils over  spongelite.

References

Eudicots of Western Australia
glomerulosa
Endemic flora of Western Australia
Plants described in 1844